The 2012–13 Alabama A&M Bulldogs basketball team represented Alabama Agricultural and Mechanical University during the 2012–13 NCAA Division I men's basketball season. The Bulldogs, led by head coach Willie Hayes, played their home games at Elmore Gymnasium and were members of the Southwestern Athletic Conference. They finished the season 11–20, 6–12 in SWAC play to finish in eighth place. They advanced to the semifinals of the SWAC tournament where they lost to Southern.

Roster

Schedule

|-
!colspan=9| Regular season

|-
!colspan=9| 2013 SWAC Basketball tournament

References

Alabama A&M Bulldogs basketball seasons
Alabama AandM